"Samba em Prelúdio" is a song composed in 1962 by the Brazilian guitarist Baden Powell and the composer Vinicius de Moraes and recorded by many other artists.

Notable recordings
Esperanza Spalding released a version of the song on her 2008 album Esperanza, which was made a part of the Edexcel GCSE music syllabus in the UK.
Melody Gardot and Philippe Powell included the song in their 2022 album Entre eux deux.

References

Songs with lyrics by Vinicius de Moraes
Brazilian songs
1962 songs